Terbium(IV) oxide is an inorganic compound with a chemical formula TbO2. It can be produced by oxidizing terbium(III) oxide by oxygen gas at 1000 atm and 300 °C.

Decomposition
Terbium(IV) oxide starts to decompose at 340 °C, producing Tb5O8 and oxygen.

5 TbO2 → Tb5O8 + O2

References

See also
Terbium(III) oxide
Terbium(III,IV) oxide

Terbium compounds
Oxides